The 2023 Winter Cup is an artistic gymnastics competition that was held at Freedom Hall in Louisville, Kentucky on February 24-26, 2023. Like in recent years, this competition included both men's and women's gymnastics.

Background 
Louisville was selected as the host of the event in December 2022.

Competition schedule 
The competition will feature senior and junior competitions for both women's and men's disciplines. The competition schedule was as follows (all times in eastern).

Friday, February 24:
 Winter Cup – Senior Men – Day 1, 1:30 p.m.
 Nastia Liukin Cup, 7:30 p.m.

Saturday, February 25:
 Winter Cup – Senior Women, 12:30 p.m.
 Elite Team Cup, 6:00 p.m.

Sunday, February 26:
 Winter Cup – Junior Women, 12:00 p.m.
 Winter Cup – Senior and Junior Men – Day 2, 5:30 p.m.

Medalists

Nastia Liukin Cup 

The 14th annual Nastia Liukin Cup was held in conjunction with the 2023 Winter Cup. A total of 40 gymnasts advanced to the competition, making it one of the largest fields in the event's history.

Medal winners

References 

U.S. Winter Cup
Gymnastics
Winter Cup
Winter Cup
Winter Cup